Ostorhinchus limenus, or Sydney's cardinalfish, is a species of ray-finned fish native to rocky estuaries and offshore reefs in southeastern Australia.

References

limenus
Fish described in 1988